This is a list of news presenters by nationality.

List of news presenters by nationality

American news anchors

 Roz Abrams, formerly of CBS News, ABC's Eyewitness News
 Christiane Amanpour, CNN
 Ernie Anastos (retired), formerly of WNYW, WABC-TV and WCBS-TV
 Sade Baderinwa, WABC-TV
 Bret Baier, Fox News
 Rudi Bakhtiar, formerly at CNN and last seen at Fox News as a correspondent
 Dana Bash, CNN
 Martin Bashir, MSNBC, formerly ABC's Nightline
 Pat Battle (anchorwoman), WNBC Weekend Today in New York
 Bill Beutel (deceased), WABC-TV formerly ABC News
 Wolf Blitzer, CNN
 David Bloom (deceased), NBC News and co-anchor of the Today
 Bill Bonds, formerly of WXYZ-TV, WABC-TV and KABC-TV
 Sandra Bookman, WABC-TV
 Ed Bradley (deceased), CBS News
 Kate Bolduan, CNN
 David Brinkley (deceased) The Huntley–Brinkley Report NBC
 Tom Brokaw (retired), formerly NBC News
 Pamela Brown, CNN
 Campbell Brown, formerly NBC News
 Dara Brown, MSNBC
 Aaron Brown, formerly at CNN and ABC News
 Cheryl Burton, WLS-TV
 Neil Cavuto, Fox News
 John Chancellor (deceased), NBC Nightly News
 John Charles Daly (deceased), ABC News
 Liz Cho, WABC-TV, formerly ABC News
 Connie Chung, formerly of CBS News, NBC News, CNN, and MSNBC
 Casey Coleman (deceased), WJW-TV
 Amanda Congdon, Rocketboom
 Anderson Cooper, CNN
 Katie Couric, formerly at NBC News, CBS News, ABC News and Yahoo News
 David Crabtree, WRAL-TV
 Walter Cronkite (deceased), CBS News
 Chris Cuomo, formerly of ABC News and CNN
 Ann Curry, formerly of NBC News Today
 Chet Curtis, NECN
 Faith Daniels, formerly of CBS News and NBC News
 José Díaz-Balart, Telemundo
 Lou Dobbs, Fox Business, formerly CNN 
 Sam Donaldson, ABC News
 Hugh Downs (deceased), ABC News 20/20, formerly at NBC News
 Maurice DuBois, WCBS-TV
 Jerry Dunphy (deceased), KCBS-TV, KCAL-TV, KABC-TV
 Douglas Edwards (deceased), CBS News, 1950s
 Steve Edwards, KHOU-TV WLS-TV KCBS-TV KABC-TV KCAL-TV and KTTV
 Josh Elliott, CBS News, NBC Sports, ABC's Good Morning America, co-anchor of ESPNEWS
 Harris Faulkner, Fox News
 Greg Fishel, WRAL-TV
 Hal Fishman (deceased), KTLA-TV
 Charlie Gaddy (retired), WRAL-TV
 Rick Gall, WRAL-TV
 Jim Gardner, WPVI-TV
 Dave Garroway (deceased), Today NBC
 Willie Geist, MSNBC and co-anchor of the Sunday Today NBC
 John Gibson, Fox News
 Charles Gibson, ABC News
 Nancy Grace, CNN
 Enrique Gratas (deceased), Estrella TV, formerly Univisión
 David Gregory, NBC News
 Roger Grimsby (deceased) formerly of WABC-TV, KGO-TV and WNBC
 Bryant Gumbel, former anchor of NBC's Today and CBS' The Early Show
 Savannah Guthrie, current co-anchor of NBC's Today
 Tamron Hall, formerly of NBC's Today, NBC News and MSNBC
 Judd Hambrick
 Mike Hambrick
 John Hambrick, formerly WEWS-TV, KRON-TV, KABC-TV, WNBC, WTVJ and WCIX
 Leon Harris, WJLA-TV
 Jim Hartz (deceased), formerly NBC News
 Paul Harvey (deceased), News & Comment, ABC radio
 Erica Hill, formerly NBC News now CNN
 Lester Holt, NBC Nightly News, Dateline NBC
 Calvin Hughes, WPLG Local 10
 Brit Hume, Fox News, formerly ABC News
 Chet Huntley (deceased), The Huntley–Brinkley Report (NBC)
 Jackie Hyland, WRAL-TV
 Steve Inskeep, Morning Edition, NPR
 Natalie Jacobson (retired), WCVB-TV
 Chris Jansing, MSNBC
 Peter Jennings (deceased), ABC News
 Jim Jensen (deceased), WCBS-TV
 Mike Jerrick Good Day Philadelphia anchor on WTXF-TV
 Larry Kane (retired), WPVI-TV, WCAU and KYW-TV
 Megyn Kelly, Fox News and NBC News
 Gayle King, CBS This Morning
 Hoda Kotb,  current co-anchor of NBC's Today
 Ted Koppel, ABC News
 Bill Kurtis, former WBBM-TV anchor, now at CBS News
 Nicole Lapin, CNN, CNN Pipeline, HLN
 Matt Lauer, formerly of NBC News Today
 Jim Lehrer (deceased), The NewsHour with Jim Lehrer (PBS)
 Don Lemon, CNN
 Dan Lewis, KOMO-TV News
 Art Linkletter (deceased), KGB-AM radio, San Diego (1930s)
 Tom Llamas, WNBC-TV former ABC News and NBC News
 Nancy Loo, WFLD, former WABC-TV
 Robert MacNeil (retired), The MacNeil/Lehrer NewsHour (PBS)
 Rachel Maddow, MSNBC
 Paul Magers, (retired) former KSTP-TV KATU-TV KGTV-TV KARE-TV KCBS-TV
 Ron Magers, (retired) former WMAQ-TV WLS-TV
 Carol Marin, WMAQ-TV, formerly WBBM-TV
 Chris Matthews, MSNBC
 Kathleen Matthews, WJLA-TV
 Frank McGee (deceased), NBC News
 Andrea Mitchell, NBC News and MSNBC
 Natalie Morales, formerly Today currently host The Talk CBS
 Piers Morgan, CNN
 Paul Moyer, KNBC, formerly KABC-TV
 Bill Moyers, Moyers and Company
 Roger Mudd, CBS News, NBC News, History
 David Muir, ABC World News Tonight 
 Edward R. Murrow (deceased)
 Edwin Newman (deceased), NBC News
 Kent Ninomiya (retired), formerly of KSTP-TV, KCOP/KTTV, KGO-TV, WLS-TV, KIEM
 Deborah Norville, formerly of CBS News and NBC News
 Norah O'Donnell, CBS Evening News
 Miles O'Brien, CNN
 Bill O'Reilly, formerly of Fox News
 Keith Olbermann, MSNBC
 Don Owen (deceased) (news anchor) KSLA-TV
 Jane Pauley, formerly NBC News now CBS News
 Scott Pelley, CBS Evening News
 Gordon Peterson, WJLA-TV, formerly at WUSA (TV)
 Kyra Phillips, CNN
 Stone Phillips, Dateline NBC
 Rebecca Quick, CNBC Squawk Box
 Jorge Ramos, Univision
 Dan Rather (retired), CBS News
 Bill Ratner, WRAL-TV
 Harry Reasoner (deceased), CBS News and ABC News
 Ralph Renick (deceased), WTVJ
 Frank Reynolds (deceased), ABC News
 Dennis Richmond (retired), KTVU
 Bill Ritter, WABC-TV
 Geraldo Rivera, Fox News
 Amy Robach, formerly NBC News now ABC News
 Robin Roberts, ABC News, 
 John Roberts, Fox News, formerly CBS News, CNN
 Max Robinson (deceased), ABC News
 Michele Ruiz, KNBC, KTLA, Channel One News
 Tim Russert (deceased), NBC News
 Morley Safer (deceased), 60 Minutes CBS
 Maria Elena Salinas, Univision
 Andrea Sanke, TRT World
 Al Sanders (deceased), WJZ-TV
 Jessica Savitch (deceased), NBC News and Frontline
 Diane Sawyer, ABC News
 Forrest Sawyer
 Rose Ann Scamardella (anchor), Eyewitness News
 Chuck Scarborough, WNBC
 Bob Schieffer, CBS News
 Bill Sharpe, WCSC-TV
 Bella Shaw, CNN (Showbiz Today)
 Bernard Shaw (retired), CNN
 Kent Shocknek, KCBS-TV
 Maria Shriver (on leave of absence), CBS News and NBC News
 Sue Simmons, WNBC
 Harry Smith, NBC News formerly at CBS News
 Howard K. Smith (deceased), ABC News, formerly at CBS News
 Shepard Smith, Fox News
 Alison Starling, WJLA-TV
 George Stephanopoulos, ABC News
 Lori Stokes, WABC-TV
 John Stossel, formerly of Fox News, Fox Business, ABC News' 20/20 (May 2003)
 Tom Suiter, WRAL-TV
 Kathleen Sullivan, formerly of CNN, ABC News, CBS News, NBC News
 Jake Tapper, CNN
 Mark Thompson
 Marie Torre (deceased), anchorwoman for KDKA-TV
 Jerry Turner (deceased), WJZ-TV
 Tina Tyus-Shaw, WSAV-TV
 Garrick Utley (deceased), CNN, formerly NBC News and later ABC News
 Greta Van Susteren, Fox News
 Jim Vance (deceased), WRC-TV 
 Elizabeth Vargas, ABC News, 20/20 and ABC World News Tonight
 Cecilia Vega, formerly ABC News, World News Tonight Saturday
 Meredith Vieira, NBC News
 Liz Wahl, formerly RT
 Bree Walker, formerly of KGTV, KCBS-TV and WCBS-TV
 Chris Wallace, Fox News, formerly at NBC News and later ABC News
 Mike Wallace (deceased), 60 Minutes CBS
 Barbara Walters (deceased), formerly NBC News and ABC News
 Dave Ward (retired), KTRK-TV
 Bob Weaver (deceased), WTVJ
 Tim White, WTTG
 Cindy Williams, WCSH
 Jack Williams, WBZ-TV
 Pete Williams
 Brian Williams, formerly NBC Nightly News
 Diana Williams, WABC-TV, formerly WNEV-TV (now WHDH-TV)
 Mary Alice Williams, NBC News
 Walter Winchell (deceased), The Jergens Journal, NBC radio (1930s)
 Jenna Wolfe, formerly NBC News
 Bob Woodruff (on extended absence), ABC News
 Judy Woodruff, PBS NewsHour formerly CNN
 Chris Wragge, WCBS-TV
 Gideon Yago
 Toni Yates
 Bob Young
 Linda Yu, former WMAQ-TV anchor, now at WLS-TV
 Paula Zahn, formerly of ABC News, CBS News, Fox News and CNN
 Arnold Zenker
 Marvin Zindler (deceased), KTRK-TV

Australian newsreaders

 Tony Jones, ABC
 Sandra Sully, Network Ten
 Natarsha Belling, Network Ten
 Bill Woods, Network Ten
 Kathryn Robinson, Network Ten
 Natalie Barr, Seven Network
 Anton Enus, SBS
 Ann Sanders, Seven Network
 Samantha Armytage, Seven Network
 Rebecca Maddern, Seven Network
 Georgie Gardner, Nine Network
 Michael Usher, Nine Network
 Juanita Phillips, ABC
 Janice Petersen, SBS
 Mark Ferguson, Seven Network
 Brian Henderson (retired), Nine Network
 Jim Waley (retired), Nine Network
 James Dibble (deceased), ABC
 Ron Wilson, Network Ten
 Deborah Knight, Network Ten
 Ian Ross, Seven Network
 Michael Holmes, CNN, CNN International
 Chris Bath, Seven Network
 Sir Eric Pearce (deceased), Seven Network, Nine Network
 Brian Naylor (deceased), Nine Network
 Peter Hitchener, Nine Network
 Ian Henderson, ABC
 Kathy Bowlen, ABC
 Mal Walden, Network Ten
 Helen Kapalos, Network Ten
 Jennifer Keyte, Seven Network
 Peter Mitchell, Seven Network
 David Johnston (retired), Seven Network/Network Ten
 Bruce Paige, Nine Network
 Heather Foord, Nine Network
 Bill McDonald, Network Ten
 Marie-Louise Theile (retired), Network Ten
 Rod Young, Seven Network
 Kay McGrath, Seven Network
 Sharyn Ghidella, Seven Network
 Kevin Crease (deceased), Nine Network
 Rob Kelvin, Nine Network
 Michael Smyth, Nine Network
 Rebecca Morse, Network Ten
 George Donikian, Network Ten
 Jane Doyle, Seven Network
 Dixie Marshall, Nine Network
 Sonia Vinci, Nine Network
 Tim Webster, Network Ten
 Charmaine Dragun (deceased), Network Ten
 Rick Ardon, Seven Network
 Susannah Carr, Seven Network

See also
 Ten News presenters
 National Nine News presenters
 Seven News presenters
 ABC News presenters

Austrian newsreaders 
 Armin Wolf, ORF

Bangladeshi newsreaders 
 Atiqul Haque Chowdhury, Bangladesh Television
 Iqbal Bahar Chowdhury, Voice of America
 Nurul Islam, BBC World Service

Brazilian newsreaders

Ana Paula Araújo, Rede Globo
Boris Casoy, RedeTV!
Carlos Nascimento, SBT
Chico Pinheiro, Rede Globo
Evaristo Costa, CNN Brazil
Heraldo Pereira, GloboNews
Leilane Neubarth, GloboNews
Maria Júlia Coutinho, Rede Globo
Monalisa Perrone, CNN Brazil
Rachel Sheherazade, SBT
Renata Vasconcellos, Rede Globo
William Bonner, Rede Globo
William Waack, CNN Brazil

British newsreaders and newscasters

 Dermot Murnaghan, Sky News Sky News Tonight
 George Alagiah, BBC Six O'Clock News
 Michael Aspel, BBC Nine O'Clock News in the 1960s
 Mark Austin, ITN ITV News at Ten, Sky News US Correspondent
 Tom Sandars Radio 2 Newsreader
 Zeinab Badawi, BBC World News Today
 Richard Baker, BBC Nine O'Clock News co-presenter in the 1960s and 1970s
 Reginald Bosanquet, ITN presenter
 Tom Bradby, ITN ITV News at Ten
 Fiona Bruce, BBC News at Ten, BBC News at Six and "Question Time TV Programme".
 Michael Buerk, BBC, Today Programme and previously BBC Nine O'Clock News
 Sir Alastair Burnet, ITN longtime presenter of News at Ten
 Andrea Byrne, ITN ITV Weekend News
 Jill Dando (deceased), ex-BBC presenter
 Sir Robin Day, ITN presenter in the 1950s and 1960s
 Alan Dedicoat, BBC Radio 2 newsreader (also National Lottery's "Voice of the Balls")
 Katie Derham, previously ITN ITV News at 1:30
 Daljit Dhaliwal, ITN ITN World News, Worldfocus and Foreign Exchange
 Peter Donaldson, BBC Radio 4
 Huw Edwards, BBC News at Ten
 Julie Etchingham, ITN ITV News at Ten
 Anna Ford, ITN News at Ten, retired from BBC in 2006, where she presented the BBC One O'Clock News
 Max Foster, formerly BBC News, now with CNN International
 Sandy Gall, ITN 1963 to 1992, part of the original team of News at Ten in 1967
 Andrew Gardner, one of the original team of News at Ten when it started in 1967
 Krishnan Guru-Murthy, Channel 4 News
 Mishal Husain, British news presenter for BBC Television and BBC Radio. Host on Today, BBC World News and BBC Weekend News. 
 Darren Jordon, Al-Jazeera (from November 2006)
 Natasha Kaplinsky, Previous BBC Six O'Clock News and Five News, now ITV News relief
 Kenneth Kendall, BBC Nine O'Clock News co-presenter in the 1960s and 1970s
 Tasmin Lucia Khan, ITV Daybreak; ex-BBC News presenter
 Richard Lindley, ITN ITN World News
 Sheena McDonald, Channel 4 News presenter in the 1990s
 Sir Trevor McDonald, ITN News at Ten
 Sarah-Jane Mee, Sky News The Sarah-Jane Mee Show
 Cliff Michelmore, presenter, Tonight
 Mary Nightingale, ITN ITV News at 6:30
 Leonard Parkin, ITN newsreader in the 1970s and 1980s
 Jeremy Paxman, BBC, now presenter of Newsnight
 Sophie Raworth, BBC One O'Clock News and Sunday Morning (formerly The Andrew Marr Show).
 Angela Rippon, BBC, then the (now defunct) ITV News Channel
 Selina Scott, ITN ITN World News
 Alastair Stewart, ITN ITV News at 1:30, ITV News at 6:30
 Moira Stuart, Previously of BBC Nine O'Clock News and BBC Breakfast
 Jon Snow, Channel 4 News
 Peter Sissons, Channel 4 News, later BBC Nine O'Clock News, now BBC News
 Julia Somerville, ex-ITV News, now BBC News relief
 Justin Webb, ex-BBC Six O'Clock News and BBC One O'Clock News
 Richard Whitmore (retired), BBC
 Peter Woods, former newsreader on BBC1 and BBC2
 Kirsty Young, ex-Five News
 Kay Burley, Sky News Kay Burley

Canadian news anchors

 Thalia Assuras
 Pierre Bruneau
 Peter Mansbridge
 Earl Cameron (deceased), The National News (CBC)
 Bernard Derome, Le Téléjournal (SRC)
 Dawna Friesen, Global National (Global)
 Barbara Frum (deceased), The Journal (CBC)
 Céline Galipeau, Le Téléjournal (SRC)
 Ian Hanomansing, Canada Now (CBC)
 Peter Kent, The National (CBC) and First National (Global)
 Harvey Kirck (deceased), CTV National News (CTV)
 Lisa LaFlamme, CTV National News (CTV)
 Peter Mansbridge, The National (CBC)
 Keith Morrison,  The Journal (CBC)
 Knowlton Nash (deceased), The National (CBC)
 Tara Nelson, Global National (Global)
 Kevin Newman, Global National (Global)
 Tony Parsons, Canada Tonight
 Sandie Rinaldo, CTV National News (CTV)
 Lloyd Robertson, CTV National News (CTV)
 Mutsumi Takahashi, CTV News Montreal (CTV)
 Sophie Thibault, Le TVA 22 heures, first North American solo national news anchorwoman (in 2002)
 Pamela Wallin, Canada AM (CTV) and Prime Time News (CBC)

Chinese news anchors
The following are announcers on CCTV's Xinwen Lianbo, the official national news programme in mainland China:
 Luo Jing

Colombian newsreaders
 Silvia Corzo, Caracol TV
 Mónica Jaramillo, Caracol TV
 María Lucía Fernández, Caracol TV
 Mábel Lara, Caracol TV
 Vanessa de la Torre, Caracol TV
 Ángela Patricia Janiot, CNN en Español
 Claudia Palacios, CNN en Español

Dutch newsreaders

 Laila Abid, formerly NOS Journaal
 Winfried Baijens, NOS Journaal
 Noraly Beyer, formerly NOS Journaal
 Sacha de Boer, formerly NOS Journaal
 Pia Dijkstra, formerly NOS Journaal
 Philip Freriks, formerly NOS Journaal
 Eva Jinek, formerly NOS Journaal
 Astrid Kersseboom, formerly NOS Journaal
 Anita Sara Nederlof, RTL Nieuws
 Jeroen Overbeek, NOS Journaal
 Jeroen Pauw, formerly RTL Nieuws
 Antoin Peeters, RTL Nieuws
 Marga van Praag, formerly NOS Journaal
 Loretta Schrijver, formerly RTL Nieuws
 Harmen Siezen, formerly NOS Journaal
 Dionne Stax, formerly NOS Journaal
 Annechien Steenhuizen, NOS Journaal
 Rob Trip, NOS Journaal
 Simone Weimans, NOS Journaal
 Merel Westrik, formerly RTL Nieuws
 Herman van der Zandt, formerly NOS Journaal
 Joop van Zijl, formerly NOS Journaal

Finnish newsreaders
 Arvi Lind, YLE

Egyptian newsreaders
 Ahmed Mansour (journalist)
 Yousef Gamal El Din, CNBC Europe

French newsreaders

 Patrick Poivre d'Arvor (retired), TF1
 Arlette Chabot, France 2
 Claire Chazal (retired), TF1
 David Pujadas, France 2
 Béatrice Schönberg, France 2
 Jean-Pierre Pernaut, TF1
 Melissa Theuriau, La Chaîne Info, then M6
 Christine Ockrent, France 2 and France 3
 Marie Drucker, France 2
 Audrey Pulvar, France 3
 Léon Zitrone, TF1
 Elise Lucet, France 2
 Laurent Delahousse, France 2

German newsreaders

 Dagmar Berghoff, ARD Tagesschau
 Petra Gerster, ZDF Heute
 Jan Hofer, ARD Tagesschau
 Lothar Keller, RTL aktuell
 Claus Kleber, ZDF Heute Journal
 Peter Kloeppel, RTL aktuell
 Judith Rakers, ARD Tagesschau
 Jens Riewa, ARD Tagesschau
 Steffen Seibert, ZDF Heute and ZDF Heute Journal
 Marietta Slomka, ZDF Heute Journal
 Thomas Roth, ARD Tagesthemen
 Wilhelm Wieben, ARD Tagesschau

Greek newsreaders
 Maria Houkli, NET, ERT
 Nikos Hadjinikolaou, Alpha TV
 Elli Stai, ANT1
 Eva Kaili, weekends, Mega Channel

Hong Kong news anchors
 Lavender Cheung, Cable News Hong Kong
 Cheung Wai Tsz, ATV News

Indian newsreaders
 Arnab Goswami, Republic TV
 Vineet Malhotra, News World India
 Vikram Chandra, NDTV
 Naveen Soni, Zee Business
 Rajat Sharma, India TV
 Sweta Singh, Aaj Tak
 Sudhir Chaudhary, Zee News
 Anjana Om Kashyap, Aaj Tak

Irish newscasters
 Bryan Dobson, RTÉ
 Anne Doyle, RTÉ
 Sharon Ní Bheoláin, RTÉ
 Gráinne Seoige, TnaG, TV3 and Sky News Ireland
 Mary Kennedy, RTÉ
 Eileen Dunne, RTÉ
 Charles Mitchel, RTÉ
 Colette Fitzpatrick, Virgin Media
 Claire Brock, Virgin Media

Israeli news anchors
 Yonit Levi, The Central Newscast ("HaMahadura HaMerkazit", Channel 2)
 Yair Lapid, Friday Studio ("Ulpan Shishi", Channel 2)
 Miki Haimovich, News 10 ("Hadashot 10", Channel 10), Channel 2 ("HaMahadura HaMerkazit", Channel 2) (retired)
 Ya'akov Eilon, Channel 2 ("Hadashot")
 Haim Yavin (retired), Mabat (Channel 1)
 Tali Moreno, News 10 ("Hadashot 10", Channel 10)
 Oshrat Kotler, News 10 ("Hadashot 10", Channel 10, former Channel 2)

Japanese newscasters
 Hiroko Kuniya, NHK (Japan Broadcasting Corporation)
 Shinichi Takeda, NHK
 Masako Usui, NTV (Nippon Television Network Corporation)
 Tetsuya Chikushi, TBS (Tokyo Broadcasting System)
 Yūko Andō, FNN (Fuji Television Network)

Latin American newsreaders
 Enrique Gratas, Univision
 Joaquin Lopez Doriga, Televisa
 Ilana Sod, MTV Latin America

Malaysian newsreadees
 Norashikin Abdul Rahman (later become queen consort of Sultan of Selangor), RTM
 Farit Ismeth Emir (deceased), RTM

New Zealand newsreaders

 Judy Bailey (retired), ONE News
 Hilary Barry, 3 News
 Greg Boyed, ONE News and TVNZ News At 8
 John Campbell, 3 News
 Hamish Clark, 3 News
 Suzy Clarkson, Prime News
 Simon Dallow, ONE News
 Carly Flynn, 3 News
 John Hawkesby (retired), ONE News, formerly 3 News
 Kate Hawkesby (retired), ONE News
 Sam Hayes, 3 News
 Carol Hirschfeld, 3 News
 April Ieremia (retired), ONE News
 Richard Long (retired), ONE News 
 Sacha McNeil, 3 News, formerly ONE News
 Mike McRoberts, 3 News, formerly ONE News
 Alison Mau, ONE News, formerly Prime News
 Wendy Petrie, ONE News, formerly 3 News
 Rebecca Singh, 3 News
 Neil Waka, ONE News
 Peter Williams, ONE News
 Eric Young, Prime News, formerly ONE News and 3 News

North Korean newsreaders
 Ri Chun-hee, KCTV

Palestinian news anchors
 Jamal Rayyan

Pakistani news anchors

 Shahid Masood, ARY News
 Mubashir Luqman, ARY News
 Sana Khan, Punjab TV
 Nida Sameer, Geo News
 Ashar Zaidi, Geo News
 Sajid Hassan, Samaa TV
 Kashif Abbasi, ARY News
 Azhar Lodhi, PTV News

Philippine newscasters

 Arnold Clavio, Saksi, Unang Balita, GMA Network
 Vicky Morales, 24 Oras, GMA Network
 Mike Enriquez, 24 Oras, GMA Network; Senior Vice President for Radio Operations Radio GMA
 Mel Tiangco, 24 Oras, GMA Network; Executive Vice President for Chief Operating Officer, GMA Kapuso Foundation
 Pia Arcangel, 24 Oras Weekend, Saksi, GMA Network
 Ivan Mayrina, Unang Balita, 24 Oras Weekend, GMA Network
 Howie Severino, I Witness, GMA Network
 Kara David, I Witness, GMA Network
 Connie Sison, Unang Balita, Balitanghali GMA Network
 Raffy Tima, Balitanghali, GTV
 Mariz Umali, Unang Balita, GMA Network
 Atom Araullo, State of the Nation, GTV
 Maki Pulido, State of the Nation, GTV
 Jessica Soho, GMA Network; Vice President for News of GMA News & Public Affairs
 Henry Omaga-Diaz, TV Patrol, Kapamilya Channel
 Noli De Castro, Teleradyo Balita and Kabayan, Kapamilya Channel and Teleradyo
 Alvin Elchico, TV Patrol Weekend, ABS-CBN now Kapamilya Channel
 Karen Davila, TV Patrol, Kapamilya Channel
 Tony Velasquez, Headline Pilipinas Teleradyo, ANC Headlines, Primetime on ANC and The World Tonight, ABS-CBN News Channel/Kapamilya Channel
 Bernadette Sembrano, TV Patrol, ABS-CBN now Kapamilya Channel
 Maria Ressa, former ABS-CBN, CNN Southeast Asia News Bureau Chief, now Rappler head
 Ted Failon, Ted Failon at DJ Cha Cha sa Radyo, One PH
 Korina Sanchez, Rated Korina, TV5
 Cheryl Cosim, Frontline Pilipinas, TV5 and One PH
 Julius Babao, Frontline Pilipinas, TV5
 Raffy Tulfo, formerly Frontline Pilipinas, TV5
 Luchi Cruz-Valdez, TV5 and One News Head of News and Information 
 Dong Puno (deceased)
 Angelo Castro Jr. (deceased), ABS-CBN News Channel
 Tina Monzon-Palma, ABS-CBN News Channel
 Pia Hontiveros, CNN Philippines News Night, CNN Philippines
 Pinky Webb, CNN Philippines Balitaan, CNN Philippines
 Mai Rodriguez, CNN Philippines Newsroom Weekend, CNN Philippines
 Rico Hizon, The Final Word with Rico Hizon, CNN Philippines
 Aljo Bendijo, Ulat Bayan, PTV
 Diane Querrer, Ulat Bayan, PTV
 Erwin Tulfo, formerly Ulat Bayan, PTV
 Catherine Vital, formerly PTV News Tonight, PTV
 Daniel Razon, UNTV
 PCOO Secretary Martin Andanar, formerly TV5 currently PTV
 Emma Tiglao, Mata Ng Agila and Kada Umaga,  Net 25
 Alex Santos, Mata Ng Agila, Net 25
 Anthony Taberna, formerly ABS-CBN currently DZRH
 Rey Langit, formerly Radio Philippines Network, IBC 13, PTV currently DZRJ

Portuguese newsreaders
 Ana Lourenço, RTP1/RTP3
 Carlos Daniel, RTP1/RTP3
 Cristina Esteves, RTP1/RTP3
 José Rodrigues dos Santos, RTP1
 Mário Crespo, SIC Notícias
 Pedro Pinto, TVI

Singaporean newsreaders
 Glenda Chong, News 5 Tonight
 Genevieve Woo, CNA
 Zhang Haijie, Channel 8 News
 Tung Soo Hua, Channel 8 News
 Wang Zheng, Channel 8 News
 Zhao Wenbei, Channel 8 News
 Bryan Wong, Channel 8 News

South Korean newsreaders
 Kim Hyun-woo, SBS
 Ahn Na-kyung, JTBC
 Han Min-yong, JTBC

Soviet and Russian newsreaders

Tatar newsreaders
 Abdulla Dubin, Tatarstan Television and Radio Broadcasting

Spanish newsreaders
 Iñaki Gabilondo, Cuatro
 Lorenzo Milá, TVE
 Letizia Ortiz (Princess of Asturias), former TVE
 Hilario Pino, Cuatro
 Pedro Piqueras, Telecinco
 Matías Prats Luque, Antena 3

Sri Lankan newsreaders
 Vernon Corea (deceased), Radio Ceylon 
 Jimmy Bharucha (deceased), Radio Ceylon

Swedish newsreaders
 Jarl Alfredius (deceased), Aktuellt, Sveriges Television
 Olle Björklund (deceased), Aktuellt, Sveriges Television
 Claes Elfsberg, Rapport, Sveriges Television
 Gun Hägglund (retired), Aktuellt, Sveriges Television
 Bengt Magnusson, TV4Nyheterna, TV4
 Katarina Sandström, Rapport, Sveriges Television
 Lisbeth Åkerman, Rapport, Sveriges Television

Trinidad & Tobago newsreaders
 Francesca Hawkins, CNC3 Nightly News

Turkish news anchors
 Jülide Gülizar, Turkish Radio and Television Corporation
 Mehmet Ali Birand, Mehmet Ali Birand'la Kanal D Ana Haber Bülteni, Kanal D
 Reha Muhtar, Son Kale, Kanal Türk
 Uğur Dündar, Uğur Dündar'la Star Haber, Star TV

Vietnamese newsreaders
 Lê Quang Minh, VTV
 Nguyễn Tuấn Dương, VTV

See also
 List of BBC newsreaders and reporters
 List of ITV journalists and newsreaders
 Sky News presenters and editorial team
 List of former BBC newsreaders and journalists

References